Eucalyptus vicina, commonly known as the Manara Hills red gum, is a species of mallee in the family Myrtaceae and is endemic to western New South Wales. It has smooth bark, lance-shaped to curved adult leaves, flower buds in groups of seven, white flowers and cup-shaped or hemispherical fruit.

Description
It has smooth mottled grey, brown and pinkish bark. Flowering has been observed in June, September and October and the flowers are white.

Taxonomy and naming
Eucalyptus vicina was first formally described in 1991 by Lawrie Johnson and Ken Hill in the journal Telopea from Manara Hill in western New South Wales. The specific epithet (vicina) is from the Latin vicinus meaning "neighbouring" or "closely resembling", referring to the similarity of this species to other small red gums, including E. dwyeri.

Distribution and habitat
Manara Hills red gum grows in mallee shrubland on stony hills from Griffith, New South Wales and Mutawintji National Park to north of Bourke.

References

vicina
Myrtales of Australia
Flora of New South Wales
Trees of Australia
Plants described in 1991